Boot Polish is a 1954 Hindi comedy drama directed by Prakash Arora and produced by Raj Kapoor. It won Best Film at the Filmfare Awards. The film stars Ratan Kumar and Naaz in the lead roles.

Plot
Bhola (Ratan Kumar) and Belu (Naaz) are left in the care of their wicked aunt Kamla (Chand Burke), a prostitute, after their mother dies. She forces them to beg on the streets and takes the whole collection at night, often by beating them brutally.

A bootlegger and neighbour of Kamla, named John (David) teach them self-respect and to work for a living instead of begging. Both kids start saving from their begging money by giving lesser paise to Kamla, so they can buy a shoe-polish kit and begin shining shoes. The duo manage to buy a shoe-polish kit and starts the business. But when Kamla discovers this, she beats them and kicks them out of the house.

Meanwhile, John discovers that Belu wants a new frock and Bhola needs a new shirt as their current rags are torn and worn out. Overwhelmed by the emotions to help Belu and Bhola, John Chacha decided to sell unauthorized liquor and gets arrested by the police. The children, on the other hand, are left to fend for themselves. When it rains, and people stop having their shoes polished, the children are in danger of starving. Bhola wishes never to beg again and rejects a coin tossed to him on a rainy night. When Belu takes it out of hunger, Bhola slaps her, and she drops it.

When the police come, intent on taking the children, Belu escapes onto a train, but Bhola is arrested. On board the train, Belu is adopted by a wealthy family, and she is sad for her brother.

Bhola searches for Belu after getting out of custody but cannot find her. After running away from an orphanage, he is unable to find work and extremely hungry and resorts to begging. He encounters Belu while begging at the railway station where Belu and her adopted family are boarding a train for vacation. Humiliated, Bhola runs away, but his sister pursues him. John Chacha has also come to the station to say goodbye and joins the chase, but he falls and is injured. Bhola stops running, and Belu and Bhola are reunited.

The wealthy family adopts Bhola also, and they live happily ever after.

Cast 
 Ratan Kumar as Bhola
 Naaz as Belu 
 David as John 
 Chand Burke as Kamla 
 Bhudo Advani as Pedro
 Raj Kapoor as himself

Production 
In a piece for the Indian Express on 2 April 1954 issue titled 'Why I Produced Boot Polish', Raj Kapoor wrote, "In Awaara I tried to prove that Vagabonds are not born, but are created in the slums of our modern cities, in the midst of dire poverty and evil environment. Boot Polish graphically shows the problem of destitute children, their struggle for existence and their fight against organised beggary. The purpose of this film is to bring home to you that these orphans are as much your responsibility as that of the Government. Individual charity will not solve this problem because the only solution is co-operative effort on a National scale."

Awards

1955 Cannes Film Festival
 Special Mention to a child actress - Naaz

Filmfare Awards
 Best Cinematographer - Tara Dutt
 Best Film - Raj Kapoor
 Best Supporting Actor - David

Soundtrack
Lyrics were written by Hasrat Jaipuri, Shailendra and Deepak. Music for the songs were composed by Shankar–Jaikishan.

References

External links

 Boot Polish (1954) on YouTube
 Review Essay in Visual Anthropology: Virtue Ethics of Boot Polish and Dosti, as Compared with Slumdog Millionaire

1954 films
1950s Hindi-language films
Films scored by Shankar–Jaikishan
R. K. Films films
Filmfare Awards winners
Articles containing video clips
Films about poverty in India
1954 comedy-drama films
Indian comedy-drama films
Indian black-and-white films